Gymnopilus subbellulus is a species of mushroom-forming fungus in the family Hymenogastraceae.

Description

Habitat and distribution
Gymnopilus subbellulus grows on conifer logs. It has been found in Michigan in August.

See also

List of Gymnopilus species

References

subbellulus
Fungi of North America
Fungi described in 1969
Taxa named by Lexemuel Ray Hesler